Alessandro Argoli may refer to:

Alessandro Argoli (bishop of Terracina) (died 1540), Italian Roman Catholic bishop
Alessandro Argoli (bishop of Veroli) (1594–1654), Italian Roman Catholic bishop